Ruminghem is a commune in the Pas-de-Calais department in the Hauts-de-France region of France.

Geography
Ruminghem is located about 10 miles (16 km) north of Saint-Omer on the D217 road.

Population

Places of interest
 The church of St.Martin, dating from the 18th century.

See also
 Communes of the Pas-de-Calais department
 Chinese Labour Corps

References

External links

 Ruminghem Carnival Association 

Communes of Pas-de-Calais